Club de Fútbol Villanovense is a Spanish football team based in Villanueva de la Serena, in the autonomous community of Extremadura. Founded in 1992 it plays in Segunda División RFEF – Group 4, holding home matches at Estadio Romero Cuerda, with a capacity of 5,000 seats.

History

CF Villanovense was founded in 1992 with the aim to replace dissolved CD Villanovense. Initially, the club was named Sport Club Villanueva de la Serena with players wearing blue and white vertically striped t-shirts. In the 2014–15 season, the club played for the first time the promotion play-offs to Segunda División, being eliminated in the first round by Bilbao Athletic.

The following season, the team reached the last 32 of the Copa del Rey, where they faced reigning league, cup and European champions Barcelona. Despite holding the Catalans to a goalless draw in the first leg at home, they lost 6–1 on aggregate.

In the 2016–17 season, Villanovense qualified again for the promotion play-offs, but after beating Fuenlabrada in the first round, they were eliminated by Racing de Santander.

Season to season

11 seasons in Segunda División B
1 season in Segunda División RFEF
14 seasons in Tercera División

Current squad

Honours
Tercera División: (3) 2005–06, 2010–11, 2013–14

References

External links
Official website 
Futbolme team profile 
Official forum 
 Club & stadium history Estadios de España 

Football clubs in Extremadura
Association football clubs established in 1992
1992 establishments in Spain
Province of Badajoz